George Edward Greer (born October 18, 1946) is an American baseball coach. He has served as the hitting coach for the St. Louis Cardinals of Major League Baseball (MLB) and was a head coach in college baseball for the Davidson Wildcats and Wake Forest Demon Deacons.

Playing career
Greer was raised in Westerly, Rhode Island, and graduated from Westerly High School, where he was named an All-State baseball player. He attended the University of Connecticut, where he played college baseball for the Connecticut Huskies. While at Connecticut, Greer played collegiate summer baseball for three seasons (1965–1967) with the Chatham Anglers of the Cape Cod Baseball League (CCBL) and was named a league all-star in 1965 and 1966.

Greer played as a right fielder for the United States national baseball team at the 1967 Pan American Games, hosted by Winnipeg. In the deciding game for the gold medal, Greer drove in the winning run as the U.S. defeated Cuba, 2–1.

Greer was selected by the Cardinals in the 1968 Major League Baseball draft, and played in the Cardinals system for four years, reaching Triple-A with the Tulsa Oilers in 1971.

Coaching career
In 1979 he returned to the CCBL as manager of the Cotuit Kettleers. Greer led the Kettleers to three league titles between 1979 and 1987, and managed several future major leaguers including Will Clark, Ron Darling, John Franco, and Joe Girardi. In 2002, Greer was inducted into the CCBL Hall of Fame.

Greer served as the coach of the Davidson Wildcats from 1982 to 1987 and for the Wake Forest Demon Deacons from 1988 to 2004. With Wake Forest, he had a 608–382–4 win–loss record. He joined the New York Mets organization as a minor league manager. He joined the Cardinals as a minor league baseball coach in 2015. He was promoted to the major league coaching staff on July 15, 2018. The Cardinals opted not to renew Greer's contract after the 2019 season.

Personal
Greer's wife, Becky, served as the superintendent of public schools in Radford, Virginia.

References

External links

Living people
1946 births
People from Westerly, Rhode Island
Baseball players from Rhode Island
UConn Huskies baseball players
Minor league baseball players
Cape Cod Baseball League coaches
Chatham Anglers players
Davidson Wildcats baseball coaches
Wake Forest Demon Deacons baseball coaches
St. Louis Cardinals coaches
St. Petersburg Cardinals players
Modesto Reds players
Tulsa Oilers (baseball) players
Arkansas Travelers players
Pan American Games medalists in baseball
Pan American Games gold medalists for the United States
Baseball players at the 1967 Pan American Games
Medalists at the 1967 Pan American Games